John McNutt may refer to:
 John G. McNutt, professor of urban affairs at the University of Delaware
 Tico McNutt (John McNutt), conservation biologist
 John McNutt (priest) (1914–1992), Dean of Clogher